Omar Amiralay (1944 – 5 February 2011) was a Syrian documentary film director and civil society activist. He is noted for the political criticism in his films, and played a prominent role in the events of the Damascus Spring of 2000.

Life and work
Amiralay was born in Damascus in 1944. Amiralay studied in Paris at Théâtre de la Ville between 1966-7 and later at La Fémis, before returning to Syria in 1970. He thus had a different artistic formation from the majority of Syrian film-makers, who studied in the Soviet Union or in Eastern Europe.

His films include a trilogy of documentaries concerning the Tabqa Dam on the Euphrates. The first, Film Essay on the Euphrates Dam (1970), is a tribute to Syria's greatest development project, but the second and third take a more critical approach. Everyday Life in a Syrian Village (1974) shows the dam's ambiguous impact on the lives of ordinary people in a nearby village, and portrays their relationship with the authorities, seen as distant and disconnected from them. Amiralay revisited the region in 2003 with A Flood in Baath Country, which contains trenchant political criticism (it had the working title Fifteen reasons why I hate the Baath Party). Due to the films strong indictment of the government, the film was removed from the Carthage Film Festival. In act of solidarity with Amiralay, Arab filmmakers Yousry Nasrallah, Annemarie Jacir, Nizar Hassan, Joana and Khalil Joreige, and Danielle Arbid subsequently pulled their films out of Competition to protest the festival's actions. As a result,  A Flood in Baath Country was re-programmed and screened to enthusiastic crowds.

Another notable film was There Are So Many Things Still to Say, based on interviews with the Syrian playwright Saadallah Wannous recorded while the latter was dying of cancer. The film juxtaposes Wannous' remarks with scenes from Syria's wars against Israel and the Palestinian First Intifada, as the playwright recounts, with some regret for the lost opportunities that resulted, how the Palestinian struggle became a central part of intellectual life for an entire generation.

His other films include a portrait of former Lebanese prime minister Rafiq al-Hariri, The Man with the Golden Soles, co-directed with Hala Al-Abdallah Yacoub and one of French academic and student of Middle Eastern society Michel Seurat, who died in Beirut during the Lebanese Civil War, On a Day of Ordinary Violence, My Friend Michel Seurat....

Activism
In 2000 Amiralay was a signatory to the "Declaration of the 99", a manifesto signed by 99 prominent Syrian intellectuals calling for an end to the state of emergency in force since 1963, the release of all political prisoners and prisoners of conscience, and the permitting of political parties and independent civil society organizations. This was seen as an expression of the general goals of the Syrian democratic opposition and of the movement known as the Damascus Spring in general. Amiralay was a prominent participant in the various debates and petitions that marked the Damascus Spring.

In 2005, in the aftermath of the assassination of former Lebanese prime minister Rafiq al-Hariri, Amiralay signed a declaration by Syrian intellectuals calling for a Syrian withdrawal from Lebanon and an end to the attacks on Syrian workers in that country. Despite these activities, Amiralay does not consider himself to be involved in politics, but in "civil society".

Omar Amiralay died on 5 February 2011, either from cardiac arrest or a cerebral thrombosis. In her film Omar Amiralay - Sorrow, Time and Silence (2021), Hala Al-Abdallah Yacoub features private moments of her discussions with Omar before his death, a unique testimony of his life.

Filmography
 Film Essay on the Euphrates Dam (1970)
 Everyday Life in a Syrian Village (1974)
 The Chickens (1977)
 On a Revolution (1978)
 The Misfortunes of Some... (1981)
 A Scent of Paradise (1982)
 Love Aborted (1983)
 Video on Sand (1984)
 The Intimate Enemy (1986)
 The Lady of Shibam (1988)
 East of Eden (1988)
 For the Attention of Madame the Prime Minister Benazir Bhutto (1990)
 Light and Shadows (1994)
 The Master (1995)
 On a Day of Ordinary Violence, My Friend Michel Seurat... (1996)
 There Are So Many Things Still to Say (1997)
 A Plate of Sardines (1997)
 The Man with the Golden Soles (1999)
 A Flood in Baath Country (2003)

References

External links

Rawafed: Documentary Interview with Omar Amiralay "part one". Alarabiya.net
Rawafed: Documentary Interview with Omar Amiralay "part two". Alarabiya.net
Free Syrian Translators: Flood in Baath Land (with English subtitles)

1944 births
2011 deaths
Politicians from Damascus
Syrian democracy activists
Syrian dissidents
Syrian documentary filmmakers
Syrian film directors